The third season of Fear the Walking Dead, an American horror-drama television series on AMC, premiered on June 4, 2017, and concluded on October 15, 2017, consisting of sixteen episodes. The series is a companion series and prequel to The Walking Dead, which is based on the comic book series of the same name by Robert Kirkman, Tony Moore, and Charlie Adlard. The executive producers are Kirkman, David Alpert, Greg Nicotero, Gale Anne Hurd, and Dave Erickson, with Erickson as showrunner for his third and final season.

The season follows a dysfunctional, blended family composed of Madison Clark (Kim Dickens), her fiancé Travis Manawa (Cliff Curtis), her daughter Alicia (Alycia Debnam-Carey), her drug-addicted son Nick (Frank Dillane) and his lover Luciana Galvez (Danay García), as they reach the U.S.-Mexico border and find refuge on a ranch owned by the Otto family, consisting of patriarch Jeremiah Otto (Dayton Callie) and his two sons Troy (Daniel Sharman) and Jake (Sam Underwood). Meanwhile, Victor Strand (Colman Domingo) reunites with Daniel Salazar (Rubén Blades), who was presumed dead, who returns to find his daughter Ofelia (Mercedes Mason) who was separated from the group.

Production
AMC renewed the series for a 16-episode third season on April 15, 2016. Production began in January 2017 in Baja, Mexico. This was the final season with co-creator Dave Erickson as showrunner as he left the series after the conclusion of the third season. In February 2017, it was announced that Emma Caulfield was cast in the season. In March 2017, it was revealed that Daniel Sharman joined the cast as a series regular. In April 2017, several new actors were announced having joined the series; including Dayton Callie (reprising his guest role from season 2) and Sam Underwood, who, along with Daniel Sharman play members of the Otto family; and Lisandra Tena as Lola Guerrero.

Cast

Main cast

The third season features twelve actors receiving main cast billing status, with seven returning from the first season; nine are listed as main cast members in the second season, while four new cast members are introduced. Danay García was promoted from recurring status and Daniel Sharman, Sam Underwood, Dayton Callie and Lisandra Tena were added to the main cast. This is the first season not to include Elizabeth Rodriguez, Michelle Ang and Lorenzo James Henrie  who were all credited as main cast members in previous seasons.

 Kim Dickens as Madison Clark: A cunning and domineering high school guidance counselor, the mother of Nick and Alicia, and Travis' fiancée.
 Cliff Curtis as Travis Manawa: A resolute and peacekeeping high school teacher and Madison's fiancé who is struggling to cope with the death of his son Chris.
 Frank Dillane as Nick Clark: A brave recovering heroin addict, Madison's son, and Alicia's brother.
 Alycia Debnam-Carey as Alicia Clark: The fiery yet compassionate daughter of Madison, and sister of Nick.
 Colman Domingo as Victor Strand: A smart and sophisticated conman-turned-businessman, who forms friendships with the Clark family.
 Mercedes Mason as Ofelia Salazar: The strong-willed and capable daughter of Daniel.
 Danay García as Luciana Galvez: A strong and cautious former member of the La Colonia community in Tijuana, Mexico, and Nick's girlfriend.
 Daniel Sharman as Troy Otto: The charismatic and impulsive son of Jeremiah, and Jake's half-brother. 
 Sam Underwood as Jake Otto: Jeremiah's moralistic and wiser son, Troy's half-brother, and Alicia's love interest.
 Dayton Callie as Jeremiah Otto: The racist and candid leader of Broke Jaw Ranch, and Jake and Troy's father.
 Rubén Blades as Daniel Salazar: A courageous and pragmatic former member of the Sombra Negra gang, a barber, and Ofelia's father. He returns after his disappearance in the previous season's mid-season finale.
 Lisandra Tena as Lola Guerrero: The generous and empathic leader of a community stationed at a dam located in Tijuana, who is responsible for supplying water.

Supporting cast
 Michael Greyeyes as Qaletaqa Walker: A Native American in a war with Jeremiah Otto, who he claims occupies his lands.
 Justin Rain as Lee "Crazy Dog": The right-hand man of Qaletaqa.
 Rae Gray as Gretchen Trimbol: A resident of Broke Jaw Ranch who becomes friends with Alicia.
 Hugo Armstrong as Vernon Trimbol: Gretchen's father and one of the founders of the Broke Jaw Ranch.
 Lindsay Pulsipher as Charlene Daley: A helicopter pilot for the Broke Jaw Ranch.
 Michael William Freeman as Blake Sarno: A member of the militia.
 Matt Lasky as Cooper: A member of the militia.
 Kalani Queypo as Klah Jackson: An arrogant member of the Native Americans.
 Jason Manuel Olazabal as Dante Esquivel: The leader of Gonzalez Dam.
 Jesse Borrego as Efrain Morales: A man who saves Daniel after he is injured in a fire.
 Miguel Pérez as "El Matarife": A drug dealer in El Bazar.
 Edwina Findley as Diana: A pragmatic survivor who becomes friends with Alicia.
 Ray McKinnon as Proctor John: The leader of a gang known as the Proctors.

Guest
 Noel Fisher as Willy: A sadistic member of the militia who executes survivors to learn more about the infection.
 Ross McCall as Steven: A survivor who aids Nick and Luciana to escape the militia.
 Karen Bethzabe as Elena Reyes: The Rosario Beach hotel manager.
 Brenda Strong as Ilene Stowe: A reclusive survivor in the Rosario Beach hotel who lost her sanity after her family's death.
 Ramses Jimenez as Hector Reyes: Elena's nephew.
 Linda Gehringer as Christine: A resident of Broke Jaw Ranch who forms a bond with Alicia.
 James LeGros as Eddie: A doctor at El Bazar who works for Proctor John.

Episodes

Reception

Critical response
On Rotten Tomatoes, the season has a rating of 84%, based on 6 reviews, whose average rating is 7.25/10. The site's critical consensus is, "A distinctive ensemble brings a compelling flavor of Fear the Walking Dead mythos, but this ambitious spinoff still shares its originator's penchant longwinded pacing that may diminish the tension for some viewers."

Ratings

Home media
The third season, featuring audio commentaries and deleted scenes, was released on Blu-ray and DVD on March 13, 2018.

References

External links 
 
 

03
2017 American television seasons